Invisible Friends is a 1989 children's play by the British playwright Alan Ayckbourn. It was written as a starring vehicle for actress Emma Chambers who portrayed the central character of teenager Lucy Baines in the original production at the Stephen Joseph Theatre in Scarborough, North Yorkshire, England for its run in late 1989 and early 1990. Often seen as a companion play to Woman in Mind, Lucy escapes her unhappiness with her own family by reviving her imaginary childhood friend, Zara. Lucy's family, however, do not approve of this imaginative thinking. Zara helps Lucy to make her family invisible, and Lucy feels much happier and is delighted. However, Zara outstays her welcome and soon manipulates Lucy into catering and cleaning for her and her brother Chuck and father Felix before kicking Lucy out. In the end Lucy manages to defeat Zara, Chuck, and Felix and make her family visible again, and they begin to pay more attention to her.

References

 
 

Plays by Alan Ayckbourn
1989 plays